Leoš Friedl and Daniela Hantuchová were the defending champions but decided not to play together. Friedl played with Tina Križan and lost in first round to Mike Bryan and Liezel Huber, while Hantuchová competed with Kevin Ullyett.

Mahesh Bhupathi and Elena Likhovtseva defeated Ullyett and Hantuchová in the final, 6–2, 1–6, 6–1 to win the mixed doubles tennis title at the 2002 Wimbledon Championships.

Seeds

  Jared Palmer /  Rennae Stubbs (third round)
  Donald Johnson /  Kimberly Po-Messerli (semifinals)
  Mahesh Bhupathi /  Elena Likhovtseva (champions)
  Kevin Ullyett /  Daniela Hantuchová (final)
  Leander Paes /  Lisa Raymond (quarterfinals)
  Mike Bryan /  Liezel Huber (third round)
  Jonas Björkman /  Anna Kournikova (quarterfinals)
  Mark Knowles /  Elena Bovina (first round)
  Gastón Etlis /  Paola Suárez (first round)
  Bob Bryan /  Katarina Srebotnik (quarterfinals)
  Joshua Eagle /  Barbara Schett (third round, withdrew)
  David Rikl /  Tathiana Garbin (second round)
  Brian MacPhie /  Amanda Coetzer (third round)
  Pavel Vízner /  Roberta Vinci (second round, retired)
  Martin Damm /  Květa Hrdličková (second round)
  Robbie Koenig /  Els Callens (semifinals)

Draw

Finals

Top half

Section 1

Section 2

Bottom half

Section 3

Section 4

References

External links

2002 Wimbledon Championships on WTAtennis.com
2002 Wimbledon Championships – Doubles draws and results at the International Tennis Federation

X=Mixed Doubles
Wimbledon Championship by year – Mixed doubles